Gabelia is a Georgian surname. Notable people with the surname include:
Gulnara Gabelia (born 1985), Georgian football striker
Otar Gabelia (born 1953), Georgian football manager and a former player

Surnames of Georgian origin
Georgian-language surnames
Surnames of Abkhazian origin